Diogenes (412–323 BC) was a Greek philosopher and one of the founders of Cynic philosophy.

Diogenes may also refer to:

People

 Diogenes of Apollonia or Diogenes Apolloniates (c. 460 BC), philosopher
 Diogenes of Athens (tragedian) (late 5th century or early 4th century BC), writer of tragedies
Diogenes Euergetes (died 229 BC), Macedonian garrison commander in Athens
 Diogenes of Babylon or "Diogenes the Stoic" (c. 230 – c. 150 BC), Stoic philosopher from Seleucia, frequently confused with the following
 Diogenes of Seleucia (died 146 BC), Epicurean philosopher and adviser to King Alexander of Syria
 Antonius Diogenes (2nd century CE), Greek romance writer, most notable for his work The Wonders of Thule
 Diogenes of Cappadocia (2nd century BC), 
 Diogenes of Tarsus (2nd century BC), Epicurean philosopher
 Diogenes of Judea (fl. c. 100–76 BC), general and advisor of Hasmonean king Alexander Jannaeus
 Diogenes of Athens (sculptor) (late 1st century BC–early 1st century AD), sculptor who worked in Augustan Rome
 Diogenes (explorer) (1st century AD), Greek merchant and explorer of Mountains of the Moon (Africa)
 Diogenes of Byzantium (114–129 AD), bishop of Byzantium
 Diogenes of Oenoanda (2nd century AD), Epicurean
 Diogenes Laërtius (between 200 and 500 AD), historian and philologist
 Diogenes of Edessa (d. 411/412), Bishop of Edessa
 Constantine Diogenes (died 1032), Byzantine general
 Romanos IV Diogenes (died 1072), Byzantine emperor 1068–1071, son of Constantine Diogenes
 Constantine Diogenes (son of Romanos IV) (died 1073)
 Nikephoros Diogenes (11th century), Byzantine general, son of Romanos IV
 "Diogenes" is also sometimes confused with the name of Digenes Akritas, the hero of a famous Byzantine epic.
 Diogenes, a pen-name used by Sir Max Beerbohm

Biology and medicine
Diogenes (crustacean) is a genus of hermit crabs
Diogenes syndrome, a misnomer for a mental disorder

Modern literature 
 Diogenes (British magazine), a British satirical magazine published from 1853 to 1855
 Diogenes (journal) journal from the International Council of Philosophy and Humanistic Studies
 Diogenes Verlag, a Swiss publishing house
 Diogenes Club, named after Diogenes of Sinope, co-founded by Sherlock Holmes' brother Mycroft
 Diogenes, an interstellar scout ship in Poul Anderson's The Entity
 Diogenes Small, a character created by Colin Dexter in the Inspector Morse series of books
 Diogenes Pendergast, a character from Douglas Preston and Lincoln Child's Pendergast series of books
 Diogenes Teufelsdröckh, the fictional philosopher of Clothes Philosophy described in Thomas Carlyle's Sartor Resartus

Other uses
 Diogenes Project, original name of the Wizards Project
 Mount Diogenes, another name for Hanging Rock, Victoria, Australia
 The playable character in Getting Over It with Bennett Foddy

See also 
 Diogenes of Athens (disambiguation)